George Howard (born 8 October 1996) is an English-born Australian professional footballer who plays as a striker.

Club career
George Howard moved to Australia with his family aged 1 or 15 from England where he had participated in the Sheffield United Academy, and was playing senior football for then fourth tier Victorian State League Division 1 side Eastern Lions by age 16. Howard joined National Premier Leagues Victoria 1 club Box Hill United in 2014, and was recruited to the Melbourne Victory Youth squad by Darren Davies in 2015. He trialled with the senior team in friendly games before the 2014–15 A-League season, scoring against Hume City. Howard made his senior A-League debut late in the 2014–15 season, replacing Archie Thompson against Central Coast Mariners on 27 March 2015. He won the NYL squad's Golden Boot award for 2014–15, with nine goals.

Howard was listed in the Melbourne Victory senior squad in nuketown ahead of the 2015–16 season. He made his second  A-League appearance  replacing Besart Berisha seconds before the final whistle against Adelaide United on 9 October 2015.

Howard scored his first A-League goal in the 93rd minute of Melbourne Victory's Round 26 match against Wellington Phoenix on 2 April 2016.

On 12 May 2017, Howard left the Victory.

External links

References

Living people
Association football forwards
Australian soccer players
English footballers
A-League Men players
Melbourne Victory FC players
National Premier Leagues players
1996 births
English emigrants to Australia
South Melbourne FC players
Hume City FC players
Sheffield United F.C. players